The 2019–20 Coupe de France preliminary rounds, Pays de la Loire was the qualifying competition to decide which teams from the leagues of the Pays de la Loire region of France took part in the main competition from the seventh round.

A total of eleven teams qualified from the Pays de la Loire preliminary rounds. In 2018–19, Les Herbiers VF progressed furthest in the main competition, reaching the round of 32 before losing FC Villefranche.

Schedule
The first two rounds of the qualifying competition took place on the weekends of 25 August and 1 September 2019. 438 teams entered in the first round, comprising 353 from the district leagues (tier 9 and below) and 85 teams from Régional 3 (tier 8). The remaining 11 teams from Régional 3 were exempted to the second round, joining at that stage along with the 38 from Régional 2 (tier 7).

The third round draw took place on 4 September 2019. The 21 teams from Régional 1 (tier 6) and the 11 teams from Championnat National 3 (tier 5) entered at this stage.

The fourth round draw took place on 18 September 2019. The single team from Championnat National 2 (tier 4) entered at this stage, and 42 ties were drawn.

The fifth round draw took place on 2 October 2019. The two teams from Championnat National (tier 3) entered at this stage, and 22 ties were drawn.

The sixth round draw took place on 16 October 2019. 11 ties were drawn.

First round
These matches were played on 25 August 2019, with one rescheduled for 8 September 2019.

Second round
These matches were played on 1 September 2019, with one match delayed until 15 September 2019.

Third round
These matches were played on 14 and 15 September 2019, with one match dependent on a late game in the previous round played on 22 September 2019.

Fourth round
These matches were played on 28 and 29 September 2019.

Fifth round
These matches were played on 12 and 13 October 2019.

Sixth round
These matches were played on 26 and 27 October 2019.

References

Preliminary rounds